Gorinta is an Indian village in Peddapuram Mandal in East Godavari District of Andhra Pradesh. It is located on the road linking Samalkot to Prathipadu.

Demographics

References
https://web.archive.org/web/20081008014422/http://www.whereincity.com/india/pincode/andhra-pradesh/east-godavari.htm
http://ourvillageindia.org/Place.aspx?PID=20313

Villages in East Godavari district